Johnny Ace (1929–1954) was an American rhythm and blues singer.

Johnny Ace is also the name of:
John Laurinaitis (born 1962), American former professional wrestler known as Johnny Ace and former Senior Vice President of Talent Operations of the WWE
"The Late Great Johnny Ace", a 1983 song by Paul Simon about the musician

See also 
Johnny Acea (1917–1963), American multi-instrumental session musician